Aaron Mitchell Dismuke (born October 13, 1992) is an American voice actor, ADR director and script writer for Funimation. He is known for his role as Alphonse Elric in the English dub of the first Fullmetal Alchemist television series, whom he voiced when he was 12 years old. He is also known for his directorial work for the English dubs of Nanbaka, Shomin Sample, Tsugumomo, Cheer Boys, Kaguya-sama: Love Is War,  Black Clover, Dr. Stone and Luck and Logic.

He has since voiced many characters for anime, mostly dubbed by Funimation.

Biography
Dismuke made his start as a young child. His cousin, voice actor and director Justin Cook, helped to gain him his first role. He started voice acting at nine years old, where he voiced Hiro Sohma and the young Akito Sohma in Fruits Basket (2001).

When he was twelve years old, he was given his first lead role as Alphonse Elric in Fullmetal Alchemist. In Fullmetal Alchemist: Brotherhood, his role of Alphonse Elric was replaced by Maxey Whitehead due to puberty, but returns to reprise his role in the live-action movie on Netflix. He also voiced the young Van Hohenheim, the Elric brothers' father in Fullmetal Alchemist: Brotherhood.

He is also the voice of many characters such as Chihiro Furuya from Sankarea, Lucifer from The Devil is a Part-Timer!, Arslan from The Heroic Legend of Arslan, Twelve from Terror in Resonance, Shun Asanaga from Endride, Hayashi from Recovery of an MMO Junkie, Leonardo Watch from Blood Blockade Battlefront, Van Fanel from The Vision of Escaflowne, Senku Ishigami from Dr. Stone and Miyuki Shirogane in Kaguya-sama: Love is War.

In 2016, he was cast in his first role in cartoons as Oscar Pine in the Rooster Teeth animated series RWBY. In 2017, he was cast as Yukiya Naruse from Code Geass: Akito the Exiled. In 2018, he was cast as Tamaki Amajiki from My Hero Academia. In 2019, he was cast in his second role in cartoons as Beetle in a Cartoon Network series Beetle + Bean.

Filmography

Anime

Animation

Television

Video games

References

External links

Aaron Dismuke at the English Voice Actor & Production Staff Database

1992 births
Living people
21st-century American male actors
American male child actors
American male film actors
American male screenwriters
Place of birth missing (living people)
American male television actors
American male voice actors
American male video game actors
American television writers
Male actors from Fort Worth, Texas
American male television writers
People from Tarrant County, Texas
American voice directors
University of North Texas alumni
Screenwriters from Texas